The Western Canada Senior Hockey League was a Canadian senior ice hockey league in the provinces of Alberta and Saskatchewan. The league lasted for three seasons from 1965-1968.

Champions
1965-66 : Calgary Spurs
1966-67 : Calgary Spurs
1967-68 : Saskatoon Quakers

External links
League profile on hockeydb.com

Defunct ice hockey leagues in Canada